Floating World, a CD based upon a Japanese Fairy Tale, is the third album by Anathallo. It was self-released in 2006. "Floating World" is the English translation of the Japanese concept of Ukiyo.

Album text
Recorded at home by Glenn Hills & Anathallo
Drums and electric guitars recorded at Glow in the Dark Studios by Matt Goldman
Mixed at Glow in the Dark Studios by Matt Goldman
Mastered at Rodney Mills Mastering House

Floating World was written and performed by
Daniel Bracken, Andrew Dost, Matthew Joynt, Nathan Sandburg,Joel Thiele, Seth Walker, and Bret Wallin

Additional musicians
Timbre, Erica Froman, Chris Hatfield, Glenn Hills, Jeremiah Johnson,Brian Siers, Morgan Stewart, and Israel Vasquez

Design by Greg Leppert for Quiet | letsbequiet.com

Song facts
 "Hanasakajijii 1-4" are based on a Japanese folk story (Hanasaka Jiisan) about a dog that digs up gold for its master.
 The songs "Dokkoise House (With Face Covered)" and "Kasa No Hone (The Umbrella's Bones)" are both from a collection of poems called Japanese Peasant Songs.
 The lyrics of "By Number" feature a Japanese translation of Psalm 139:5, "Thou hast beset me behind and before, and laid thine hand upon me."
 The song "Yuki! Yuki! Yuki!" was featured in a late 2007 Vicks ad.
 "Dokkoise House (With Face Covered)" makes use of  time

Track listing
"Ame" – 0:49
"Genessaret (Going Out Over 30,000 Fathoms of Water)" – 5:32
"Hoodwink" – 5:48
"By Number" – 5:08
"Dokkoise House (With Face Covered)" – 6:00
"Hanasakajijii (Four: A Great Wind, More Ash)" – 4:44
"Hanasakajijii (One: The Angry Neighbor)" – 3:10
"Inu (Howling)" – 1:20
"Hanasakajijii (Two: Floating World)" – 4:57
"The Bruised Reed" – 6:04
"Yuki! Yuki! Yuki!" – 1:14
"Hanasakajijii (Three: The Man Who Made Dead Trees Bloom)" – 4:26
"Cuckoo Spitting Blood" – 3:05
"Kasa No Hone (The Umbrella's Bones)" – 2:08

References

External links
 Anathallo official website

2006 albums
Anathallo albums